T-pop may refer to:

 Thai pop
 Taiwanese pop or Hokkien pop
 Turkish pop music
 Tatar pop: see Tatars